Michael Cahill may refer to:

 Michael P. Cahill (born 1961), American politician
 Michael T. Cahill, American law professor 
 Mike Cahill (filmmaker) (born 1979), American filmmaker
 Mike Cahill (golfer), (born 1951), Australian golfer
 Michael Cahill (hurler) (born 1989), Irish hurler
 Mike Cahill (tennis) (born 1952), American tennis player